Heliocybe is an agaric genus closely allied to Neolentinus and the bracket fungus, Gloeophyllum, all of which cause brown rot of wood. Heliocybe sulcata, the type and sole species, is characterized by thumb-sized, tough, revivable, often dried, mushroom fruitbodies, with a tanned symmetric pileus that is radially cracked into a cartoon sun-like pattern of arranged scales and ridges, distant serrated lamellae, and a scaly central stipe. Microscopically it differs from Neolentinus by the absence of clamp connections. Like Neolentinus, it produces abundant, conspicuous pleurocystidia.  Heliocybe sulcata typically fruits on decorticated, sun-dried and cracked wood, such as fence posts and rails, vineyard trellises in Europe, branches in slash areas, and semi-arid areas such on sagebrush or on naio branches in rain shadow areas of Hawaii, or in open pine forests.


Etymology

Heliocybe derives from the Greek helios (= the sun) and cybe (=head), and means "the sun-head". It was coined in reference to its sun-like pattern on its pileus together with its affinity to sun-baked habitats.

Classification

In older classifications, H. sulcata was known as Lentinus sulcatus or Panus fulvidus. However, there is strong phylogenetic evidence for the segregation of a group of brown rot causing fungi at the level of order, including Neolentinus and Heliocybe and Gloeophyllum, from the Polyporales where Lentinus and Panus are classified. Heliocybe has also been placed into synonymy with Neolentinus, but anatomically they differ by the absence versus the presence of clamp connections and phylogenetically Heliocybe is distinct, being either a sister group to Neolentinus or to a Neolentinus-Gloeophyllum-clade, or allied to Gloeophyllum odoratum.

References 

Gloeophyllales
Monotypic Basidiomycota genera